One Way is an American action crime thriller film written by Ben Conway and directed by Andrew Baird. Principal photography began in 2021. The film stars Colson Baker, Kevin Bacon and Travis Fimmel.

Premise
Freddy is on the run with a bag full of cash after a robbery of his crime boss. Badly wounded and betrayed by his father, Freddy gets on a dirty bus where he meets a mysterious girl and a creepy passenger.

Cast
 Colson Baker as Frederick "Freddy" Sullivan a young Crime Gang son of Fred Sr.
 Kevin Bacon as Fred Sullivan Sr. A Crime Boss fortunate drug smuggling father of Freddy.
 Travis Fimmel as Will
 Drea de Matteo as Victoria Menendez a female crime queenpin boss organization.
 Storm Reid as Rachel
 Luis Da Silva as JJ
 Rhys Coiro as Coco
 Meagan Holder as Christine
 Danny Bohnen as Oleg
 Scotty Bohnen as Caleb
 K.D. O'Hair as Helen
 Thomas Francis Murphy as Patrick, the bus driver
 Casie Baker as Lily
Jaylen Hodby as Hoodlum #1

Production
On September 11, 2020, it was announced that Colson Baker and Travis Fimmel were cast in the film. On November 2, 2020, it was announced that Kevin Bacon joined the cast. On February 8, 2021, Storm Reid joined the cast.

Principal photography began on February 2, 2021 in Thomasville, Georgia.

Release
Saban Films released the film in theaters and through video on demand in the United States on September 2, 2022.

References

External links
 

2022 films
American action thriller films
Hood films
American crime thriller films
American independent films
Films shot in Georgia (U.S. state)
2020s American films